The men's mass start race of the 2014–15 ISU Speed Skating World Cup 7, arranged in the Gunda Niemann-Stirnemann-Halle in Erfurt, Germany, was held on 22 March 2015.

Results
The race took place on Sunday, 22 March, scheduled in the afternoon session, at 16:46.

References

Men mass start
7